The chief minister of the Koshi province is the head of government of the Koshi province.The chief minister is appointed by the governor of the provinces according to Article 167 of the Constitution of Nepal.The chief minister's term is for five years and is subject to no term limits, given that he has the confidence of the assembly.

Qualification 
The Constitution of Nepal sets the qualifications required to become eligible for the office of chief minister. A chief minister must meet the qualifications to become a member of the provincial assembly. A member of the provincial assembly must be:

 a citizen of Nepal
 a voter of the concerned province
 of 25 years of age or more
 not convicted of any criminal offense
 not disqualified by any law
 not holding any office of profit

In addition to this the chief minister must be the parliamentary party leader of the party with the majority seats in the provincial assembly. If no party has a majority the chief minister must have a majority in the assembly with the support from other parties. If within thirty days of the elections the chief minister is not appointed or fails to obtain a vote of confidence from the assembly, the chief minister must be from a party having the largest number of seats in the assembly.

List of Chief Ministers of Koshi province 

 
Heads of government

References